Mark Gibbon is a Canadian television, film and voice actor known for his distinctive deep voice.

Filmography

Film

Television

Video games

References

External links

The Stargate Omnipedia Characters - M'zel (with photo)

Living people
Canadian male film actors
Canadian male television actors
Canadian male video game actors
Canadian male voice actors
20th-century Canadian male actors
21st-century Canadian male actors
Year of birth missing (living people)